Saluva Timmarusu or Saluva Nayaka or simply Timmarasu was the Prime Minister (Mahapradhana) and military commander of Krishna Deva Raya. He is also known as "Appaji". He had also served as Prime Minister under Viranarasimha Raya and Tuluva Narasa Nayaka.

Early life
He belonged to a Telugu Brahmin family. Timmarusu was born on 1461 in Machilipatnam. Timmarasu was responsible for the coronation of Krishnadevaraya. Records of Portuguese traveller Fernao Nuniz suggest that Vira Narasimha, while on his death bed, ordered Timmarasu to blind his half brother Krishnadevaraya to ensure that his own minor son of eight years would become king of the empire. Timmarasu instead presented the king with a pair of she-goat eyes in order to satisfy the wish of the dying king. This way Timmarasu ensured that Krishnadevaraya became the successor. However, K. A. N. Sastri believes that there is nothing to suggest anything but a friendly relationship between the two half-brothers. Timmarusu had very close relations with Tenali Ramakrishna and was a supporter of him.

Military career

Campaign against Gajpati
Saluva Timmarasa captured the forts of Addanki , Vinukonda , Bellamkonda , Nagarjunakonda , Tangeda and Ketavaram on his way to Kondavidu , for krishnadevaraya.

Battle of Raichur
When krishnadevaraya engaged in his campaign against Orissa, Ismail Adil Khan, sultan of Bijapur capture Raichur. Krishnadevaraya led the expedition against him with a huge army, where Saluva Timmarusu assisted him as deputy commander-in-chief in this campaign . The Muslim camp was sacked and a large booty fell into the hands of Krishnadevaraya. Raichur was recaptured.

War With Golkonda
Saluva Timmarusu appointed as the Governor of kondavidu by Krishnadevaraya, Qutb shahi forces enter the region but Timmarusu took the command of the army and defeated Quli Qutb, captured Madar - ul - Mulk , the commander of the Qutb Shahi army with many of his officers and sent them all as prisoners to Vijayanagara . Saluva also made necessary arrangements to deal with future threats.

Later years
In 1524, Krishnadevaraya crowned his minor son Yuvaraja. A few months later the prince took ill and died of poisoning. Accusing Timmarusu for this crime, Krishnadevaraya had minister and his son Prisoned and Blinded. It is said the King later released Timmarusu, on knowing that the conspiracy to kill his own son was hatched by Gajapatis of Odisha. The Gajapatis did not want their princess Jaganmohini to wed Krishadevaraya, as they believed he was not pure. The Gajapatis belonged to Suryavansha (Solar Dynasty) clan of Odisha. But had to agree to this marriage, owing to Krishnadevaraya's victory over Gajapatis. Krishanadevaraya's parents, Narasa Nayaka a chieftain from Dakshina Kannada and Nagaladevi a chieftain's daughter from Andhra, were not from the royal family of Vijayanagara (Sangama Dynasty). The king deplored and repented with Timmarusu, later on. On being released, Timmarusu spent the rest of his life in Tirupati. He refused to take any support from his former King. He died a death in poverty. His Samadhi is in Penukonda, Anantapur district of Andhra Pradesh.

Legacy
Mahamantri Timmarusu is a 1962 Indian Telugu-language historical drama directed by Kamalakara Kameswara Rao. Gummadi played the key role of Prime Minister Timmarusu. The film won a silver medal at the National Film Awards in 1962. In 1970 B. R. Panthulu  Directed and produced Kannada movie Sri Krishnadevaraya also acted as Mahamantri Timmarusu and won 1969-70 Karnataka State Film Award for Best Actor.

References

Bibliography
 K. A. Nilakanta Sastry, History of South India, From Prehistoric times to fall of Vijayanagar, 1955, OUP, New Delhi (Reprinted 2002)
 Dr. Suryanath U. Kamat, Concise history of Karnataka, 2001, MCC, Bangalore (Reprinted 2002)

Karnataka politicians
People of the Vijayanagara Empire
16th-century Indian politicians
People from Machilipatnam
1461 births
1534 deaths